Columbia Threadneedle Investments is an American asset management firm. It is a subsidiary of Ameriprise Financial and operates as its asset management arm.

History 
Columbia Threadneedle was formed in 30 March 2015 as the result of a merger between Columbia Management Group (an investment advisor and sponsor of mutual funds) and Threadneedle Asset Management (a non-US focused asset management firm based in the United Kingdom). Columbia Management Group and Threadneedle Asset Management were subsidiaries of Ameriprise Financial which were acquired in 2010 and 2003 respectively. Columbia Management was the asset management business of Bank of America.

In April 2021, Columbia Threadneedle acquired BMO's European asset management business for $845 million.

Business overview 
Columbia Threadneedle is headquartered in Boston with offices in 17 countries including Luxembourg, Singapore and the United Kingdom. Its businesses serve clients in the Americas, Europe, the Middle East and Asia.

References

External links 

Companies based in Boston
Financial services companies established in 2015
Financial services companies of the United States
Investment management companies of the United States
Mutual funds of the United States